The Clare Herald or ClareHerald.com is an Irish regional news portal, based in County Clare. It was established in 2007.

References

External links
 

Irish news websites
2007 establishments in Ireland